Expiratory apnea is a voluntary condition performed by a patient during a doctor's examination of the heart. By breathing out and then holding one's breath, it gets easier for the doctor to perform an auscultation of the heart with a stethoscope. Constantly breathing out without breathing in is also considered as expiratory apnea.

See also
Apnea

References

Medical treatments